Ravna Vala is a primeval forest located on mountains Igman and Bjelašnica in Bosnia and Herzegovina, about 20 km south-west of Sarajevo.

First time it was described in 1978.

Biology 

Ravna Vala is located at an altitude of 1280 to 1450 meters on an area of 45 ha. The geological base is limestone-dolomite on which very heterogeneous soils have been developed. The main forest species are fir and beech, but spruce, maple and other deciduous trees occur in the admixture.

In addition to other wild animals, there is also a brown bear, which is the largest wild animal in Bosnia and Herzegovina.

References

External links 

Old-growth forests
Geography of Bosnia and Herzegovina